KIIS 97.3 (call sign: 4BFM) is a commercial FM radio station in Brisbane, Australia. It is a 50/50 joint venture between Nova Entertainment and ARN.

History 
KIIS 97.3 plays current hits and a variety of 1980s, 1990s and 2000s music (Hot Adult Contemporary), primarily targeted at the 25-54 age group, the group most valued by advertisers. Brisbane's 97.3 FM  is part of the KIIS Network with sister stations in other major Australian cities - KIIS 106.5 Sydney, KIIS 101.1 Melbourne, Mix 102.3 Adelaide, 96FM Perth. In January 2015, 97.3fm rebranded with a new logo, along with sister stations in Sydney, Melbourne, Adelaide, and Perth.

The addition of DAB AAC+ Digital Radio to Brisbane means that 97.3 FM and its co-owned Classic Hits 4KQ will both be available on the digital format. The additional channel to be provided by 97.3 is called "The Edge Digital", a digital format revamp of the ARN owned Edge 96.1 in Western Sydney.

The station's headquarters in Brisbane is located in the inner-western suburb of Milton, after ARN relocated the 97.3FM and 4KQ stations from Stones Corner in May 2019. 

Launched as 97.3fm, the station was rebranded as KIIS 97.3 on 24 January 2022. The new logo is similar to the KIIS logo used in Sydney and Melbourne, however with the 97.3 frequency larger than the KIIS text. It has also retained its Hot AC music format. By December 2022, the logo reverted to the same design used by KIIS in Sydney and Melbourne.

References

External links

Radio stations in Brisbane
Radio stations established in 2001
Hot adult contemporary radio stations in Australia
Australian Radio Network
Nova Entertainment